The 32nd Blue Dragon Film Awards ceremony took place on November 25, 2011, at the Kyung Hee University Peace Hall in Seoul. Presented by Sports Chosun, it was broadcast on SBS and was hosted by actors Lee Beom-soo and Kim Hye-soo.

Nominations and winners
Complete list of nominees and winners:

(Winners denoted in bold)

References

2011 film awards
Blue Dragon Film Awards
2011 in South Korean cinema